The James A. Kirksey Plantation was a moderate plantation of  located in northwestern Leon County, Florida, United States, established by James A. Kirksey. In 1847 he served as mayor of Tallahassee. He had a large number of slaves.

The James Kirksey plantation house was prefabricated in New York and built on the site in 1832. The house is supported with 16 fluted Doric columns (8 per floor). It is located at 325 N. Calhoun Street in Tallahassee. 

It was photographed for the Historic American Buildings Survey.

Location
The Kirksey Plantation was bordered on the north by Frederick R. Cotten's Burgesstown Plantation and on the east by the William A. Carr Plantation. Today the first section of  would be on the west side of North Meridian Road at Orchard Pond Road, including Buck Pond.

1860 plantation specifics
The Leon County Florida 1860 Agricultural Census shows that the James A. Kirksey Plantation had the following:
Improved Land: 
Unimproved Land: 
Cash value of plantation: $33,000
Cash value of farm implements/machinery: $500
Cash value of farm animals: $3,405
Number of enslaved persons: 180
Bushels of corn: 6000
Bales of cotton: 454

Though the plantation was not extremely large, it was the 4th largest in the county.

The owners
The plantation was owned by James A. Kirksey who was born in 1804 and died in 1878. Though not a large plantation owner, James Kirksey was involved in state politics as an election inspector in 1845. and also a delegate to the Florida Secession Convention on January 10, 1861.

References
Rootsweb Plantations
Largest Slaveholders from 1860 Slave Census Sschedules
Paisley, Clifton; From Cotton To Quail, University of Florida Press, c1968.

External links
Photos of home in 1962

Sources

Plantations in Leon County, Florida
Cotton plantations in Florida
1832 establishments in Florida Territory